Academia Deportiva Fancesa is a Bolivian football club based in Sucre, Chuquisaca. The club was founded on 10 March 1965, and compete in the Bolivian Football Regional Leagues, holding home matches at the Estadio Olímpico Patria, with a capacity of 30,700 people.

History
Named after the Fábrica Nacional de Cemento S.A. (FANCESA), the club reached the final of the Copa Simón Bolívar in 2002, missing out a direct promotion after losing to Aurora. They also lost the promotion/relegation play-off against Independiente Petrolero, and remained in the second division.

The club was also one of the participants of the 2022 Copa Bolivia, but the tournament was cancelled.

References

Football clubs in Bolivia
Association football clubs established in 1965
1965 establishments in Bolivia